Plaza de Toros de los Califas is a building in Córdoba, Spain. It is currently used for bull fighting. The stadium holds 14,000 people after the installation of red seats. It was built in 1965.

References

Califas
Buildings and structures in Córdoba, Spain
Sports venues in Andalusia